The 1999–2000 season saw St Johnstone compete in the Scottish Premier League where they finished in 5th position with 42 points.

Results
St Johnstone's score comes first

Legend

Scottish Premier League

Scottish Cup

Scottish League Cup

UEFA Cup

Final league table

References

External links
 St Johnstone 1999–2000 at Soccerbase.com (select relevant season from dropdown list)

St Johnstone F.C. seasons
St Johnstone